Rankoth Pedige Waruna Lakshan Dayaratne (born 14 May 1988) is a Sri Lankan athlete specialising in the javelin throw. He represented his country at the 2017 World Championships without qualifying for the final.

His personal best in the event is 82.19 meters, set in Diyagama in 2017.

International competitions

References

1988 births
Living people
Sri Lankan male javelin throwers
World Athletics Championships athletes for Sri Lanka